5150: Home 4 tha Sick is the debut extended play by American rapper Eazy-E. It was released on December 15, 1992 by Ruthless Records and Priority Records. 5150: Home 4 tha Sick peaked at #70 on the Billboard 200 and #15 on the Top R&B/Hip-Hop Albums. It was the final original album from Ruthless Records to be released by Priority.

"Only If You Want It" was given both a single release and promotional music video. "Neighborhood Sniper" also had a promotional music video released. "Merry Muthaphuckkin' Xmas" was released as a single by Record Store Day in a limited run of 2000 copies with "Niggaz My Height Don't Fight" as the b-side.

The EP was certified Gold by the RIAA on February 9, 1993. According to Eazy E’s son Lil E, the EP was later certified Platinum. All the songs were included on the remastered version of Eazy-E's premiere, Eazy-Duz-It.

Track listing

On the vinyl EP, "Merry Muthaphuckkin' Xmas" is listed as "Merry Muthafuckin' X-Mas".

Personnel

 Bobby "Bobcat" Ervin – producer (track 4)
 Makeba Fields – guest appearance (track 5)
 Brian Knapp Gardner – mastering
 Jerry Heller – management
 Tarasha Hudson – guest appearance (track 5)
 Gregory Fernan Hutchinson – producer (track 3)
 Rahsaan "Buckwheat" Jackson – guest appearance (track 5)
 Henrik Milling – producer (track 5)
 Rudy Ray Moore – guest appearance (track 5) as Dolemite
 Dean Karr – photography
 Dino Paredes – art direction & design
 Donovan "The Dirt Biker" Sound – recording & mixing
 Eric "Eazy-E" Wright – main artist, executive producer, art direction & design
 Atban Klann – guest appearance (track 5)
 Madness 4 Real – producers (track 5)
 Naughty by Nature – producers (track 2)

Charts

Chart positions

Year-end charts

Certifications

References

1992 debut EPs
Eazy-E albums
Hip hop EPs
Ruthless Records EPs
Gangsta rap EPs